Zatrephes magnifenestra is a moth in the family Erebidae. It was described by Felix Bryk in 1953. It is found in Brazil.

References

Phaegopterina
Moths described in 1953